Akademgorodok (meaning: "academic campus" or "academic town") is a name of districts in several cities in former USSR (now in Russia and Ukraine):

 Akademgorodok in Novosibirsk - probably the largest one
 Akademgorodok (Tomsk), in Tomsk, Russia
 Akademgorodok (Krasnoyarsk), in Krasnoyarsk, Russia
 Irkutsk has one as well